Ivan Brajović (born 9 March 1962) is a Montenegrin politician. He is a former President of the Parliament of Montenegro and former Minister of Transport and Maritime Affairs in the government of Montenegro. He is the founder and current president of the Social Democrats of Montenegro (SD) political party.

Biography
Ivan Brajović, was born in 1962 in Titograd (present-day Podgorica), Montenegrin Capital City, at that time part of the Socialist Republic of Montenegro of SFR Yugoslavia. Having finished elementary and secondary school in Danilovgrad, Brajović graduated at the Faculty of Civil Engineering at the Veljko Vlahović University.

Political career
Until the introduction of the multi-party system, Brajović was a delegate in the Danilovgrad Municipality, member of the Presidency of the League of Socialist Youth of Yugoslavia, Vice-President of the Assembly of the Socialist Republic of Montenegro. With the introduction of multi-party system in 1990 he was one of the founders of the Union of Reform Forces for Montenegro and the Social Democratic Party of Montenegro (SDP). He served as SDP Secretary of the Executive Board and Vice President of the Party.

He was a Minister of Interior Affairs in 5th cabinet of Milo Đukanović (2009-2010) and cabinet of Igor Lukšić (2010–2012), and later Minister of  Transport and Maritime Affairs in 6th cabinet of Milo Đukanović (2012–2016).

In 2015 he became one of the founders of the Social Democrats of Montenegro (SD), when the faction of the Social Democrstic Party of Montenegro defected from the political party, and formed new political subject, after the split between pro-DPS faction lead by Brajović and party leader Ranko Krivokapić. After 2016 parliamentary election, he was elected President of the Parliament.

In the 2020 Montenegrin parliamentary election Brajović won 4.10 of the votes, granting the Social Democrats of Montenegro 3 seats in Parliament.

See also
 Social Democrats of Montenegro

References

1962 births
Living people
Politicians from Podgorica
Social Democratic Party of Montenegro politicians
People excommunicated by the Serbian Orthodox Church
Speakers of the Parliament of Montenegro
Government ministers of Montenegro
Interior ministers of Montenegro